FBF may refer to:

Sport 
 Benin Football Federation
 Bolivian Football Federation
 Burkinabé Football Federation
 Federação Bahiana de Futebol, the Football Federation of Bahia, Brazil

Other uses 
 Fédération Bancaire Française, the French Banking Federation
 Fine Air, an American cargo airline
 Flange-bearing frog
 Floyd Bennett Field, a former airfield near New York City
 Forbrugsforeningen, a Danish trade loyalty society
 Frankfurt Book Fair, a German trade fair
 Fredrika Bremer Association, a Swedish women's rights organization
 Free the Bears Fund, an Australian wildlife charity
 Feed Back Filter, the Feed Back Part of decision Feedback equalizer, the other part is Feed-forward filter